Mohamed v President of the Republic of South Africa, [2001] ZACC 18, is a 2001 decision of the Constitutional Court of South Africa dealing with the legality of the South African government's actions in handing over Khalfan Khamis Mohamed to United States authorities. The court ruled that the South African government may not extradite a suspect who may face the death penalty without seeking an assurance from the receiving country that the suspect will not be sentenced to death.

See also
 Section Eleven of the Constitution of South Africa
 S v Makwanyane (abolishing the death penalty in South Africa)
 Soering v United Kingdom (similar ruling from the European Court of Human Rights)
 United States v. Burns (similar ruling from the Supreme Court of Canada)

References

External links
 Text of the judgment from SAFLII

Constitutional Court of South Africa cases
Extradition case law
Death penalty case law
South African criminal case law
2001 in South African law
2001 in case law